WarioWare, Inc.: Mega Party Game$! is a party video game for the GameCube. A remake of WarioWare, Inc.: Mega Microgames!, and the second installment in the WarioWare series. The game translates the "microgame" gameplay of Mega Microgames! to be playable in a multiplayer environment. It comes with eight special multiplayer modes for up to four players that all involve the known microgames in some way.

Gameplay
Its gameplay shares elements with other WarioWare titles, emphasising quick consecutive minigames for the player to complete (dubbed by the game as "microgames"), but focuses more on multiplayer than other games in the series. Many of the microgames are taken from the original WarioWare, Inc.: Mega Microgames!

Development
The game was developed by Intelligent Systems and Nintendo Research & Development 1, and published worldwide by Nintendo in October 2003 in Japan, and a year later in April for North America and in September for Europe. The game was produced by Takehiro Izushi and Ryoichi Kitanishi, directed by Goro Abe and Osamu Yamauchi and composed by Masanobu Matsunaga and Kenichi Nishimaki.

Reception
Mega Party Games! received generally favorable reviews upon release, with reviewers commonly citing the game's multiplayer appeal as a positive, but its copied material from Mega Microgames! as a negative. GameRankings gave the game an aggregated score of 77% based on 53 reviews. The game is the first in the series to introduce a focus of multiplayer, a theme that would not be re-visited by the series until the console sequel WarioWare: Smooth Moves on the Wii in 2006.

Notes

References 

2003 video games
GameCube games
GameCube-only games
Games with GameCube-GBA connectivity
Intelligent Systems games
Multiplayer and single-player video games
Nintendo Research & Development 1 games
Party video games
Video games developed in Japan
WarioWare